David Aliaga is a Spanish writer and editor. In 2021, he was named by Granta magazine as one of the best young writers in the Spanish language.

He studied journalism at the Autonomous University of Barcelona and obtained a Master's in Humanities from the Universitat Oberta de Catalunya. He specializes in the representation of identity, both in contemporary literature and in comics. He regularly writes for the magazines Quimera and Cuadernos Hispanoamericanos, for the portal Sala de Peligro, and for Marvel Comics in Spain. His articles have also been published in international media such as Avispero (Mexico) and Jewish Renaissance (England). In 2018, he co-directed the third edition of Séfer, the Barcelona Jewish Book Festival, with Víctor Sorenssen.

He is also the author of four works of fiction. Notables among these are Y no me llamaré más Jacob (2016) and El año nuevo de los árboles (2018). His stories have been translated into English, Italian and Icelandic. In 2021, he was included in "10 de 30", a program to promote Spanish authors abroad. The same year, the Barcelona City Council awarded him the Montserrat Roig writing scholarship.

References

Spanish writers